Marcelle Lalou (1890–1967) was a 20th-century French Tibetologist. Her major contribution to Tibetology was the cataloging of the entire Pelliot collection of Old Tibetan manuscripts from Dunhuang at the Bibliothèque nationale de France. In addition to her cataloging work, she wrote articles on various aspects of Old Tibet, and she published a Tibetan textbook. Some of her most notable students include Rolf A. Stein and J. W. de Jong.

Lalou was born August 23, 1890 at Meudon-Bellevue between Paris and Versailles. She was interested in art from an early age, and she painted and drew for pleasure her whole life. Her studies began in Art History, and many of her early publications are devoted to Art-historical themes.

Lalou volunteered as a nurse in the first world war. She made her start in Buddhist Studies following the war, studying Sanskrit with Sylvain Lévi and Tibetan with Jacques Bacot. She finished her doctorate in 1927 at the École Pratique des Hautes Études, where she later taught from 1938 to 1963. She was the secretary and later manager for the Bibliographie Bouddhique, and she was the chief editor of Journal Asiatique from 1950 to 1966. For her work, Lalou was dubbed a Knight of the Légion d'honneur.

Works of Marcelle Lalou
1921
Méghadouta (Le nuage messager) de Kālidāsa, Paris, « Sans Pareil », 1921, in-16, 69 pages.
1925
"Trois récits du Dulva reconnus à Ajantā", in Journal Asiatique, 1925, p. 333-337.
1927
"La version tibétaine du Ratnakūṭa. Contribution à la  bibliographie du Kanjur", in Journal Asiatique, oct.-déc. 1927, p. 233-259.
1929
"Notes sur la décoration des monastères bouddhiques, à propos d'un livre récent, de M. Goloubew", in, 5e année, 3, 1929, p. 87-102.
"La version tibétaine des Prajnāpāramitā", in Journal Asiatique, juill.-sept. 1929, p. 87-102.
1930
Iconographie des étoffes peintes (pata) dans le Mañjuśrīmūlakalpa, dans Buddhica, 1re série, VI, Paris, Geuthner, 1930, in-8°, 116 pages, 7 planches hors texte.
1931
"Catalogue des fonds tibétains de la Bibliothèque nationale, IVe partie : I. Les Mdo-man", in Buddhica, 2e série, IV, Paris, Geuthner, 1931, in-8°.
“Rétrospective: l’œuvre de Léon Feer.” Bibliographie bouddhique II (1931): 1-17.
1932
"Un traité de magie bouddhique", in Études d'orientalisme... à la mémoire de Raymonde Linossier, Paris, Leroux, 1932, t. II, p. 303-322.
1933
"Le da drag tibétain" in Bulletin of the School of Oriental Studies VII, janv. 1933, p. 87-89. (with J. Przyluski)
Répertoire du Tanjur d'après le catalogue de P. Cordier, avec une préface de Paul Pelliot, Paris, Bibliothèque nationale, 1933.
1934
Rétrospective : l'œuvre de M. le professeur Paul Pelliot, in Bibliographie bouddhique, IV-V, 1934, p. 1-29.
1935
Louis de La Vallée Poussin, dans Mélanges chinois et bouddhiques, VI, 1939, p. 5-10, 1 photo (en collaboration avec J. Przyluski).
Trois aspects de la peinture bouddhique, dans Annuaire de l'Institut de Philologie et de d’Histoire orientale, III, Bruxelles, 1935, p. 245-261, 9 planches. (Originally delivered at the Conférence faite à l'Institut d'histoire et de philologie orientales, de l'Université de Bruxelles, le 27 avril 1934.)
1936
"Mañjuśrīmūlakalpa et Tārāmūlakalpa." Harvard Journal of Asiatic Studies, 1936, p. 327-349.
Les « Cent mille nāga », Festschrift Moriz Winternitz, Leipzig, Harras-sowitz, 1933, p. 79-81.
"Notes à propos d'une amulette de Touen-houang : les litanies de Tārā et la Sitātapatrādhāranī." Mélanges chinois et bouddhiques, IV, 1936, p. 135-149,1 planche.
"Récits populaires et contes bouddhiques." Journal Asiatique, avril-juin 1936, p. 177-191 (with J. Przyluski).
"L'Histoire de Rāma en tibétain", in Journal Asiatique, octobre-décembre 1936, p. 560-562.
1937
"Ganeśa-Vaiśavana." Journal Asiatique 1937, p. 301-302.
1938
"A Tun-huang prelude to the Karandavyūha", in Indian Historical Quarterly  XIV, 1938, p. 198-200.
"Notes de mythologie bouddhique : 1. Yaksa et Gandharva dans le Mahāsamayasuttanta" in Harvard Journal of Asiatic Studies, 3.1, 1938, p. 40-46  (in collaboration with J. Przyluski).
Notes de mythologie bouddhique : 2. Les Rgyud sum-pa manuscrits de Touen-houang, in Harvard Journal of Asiatic Studies, 1938, p. 126-136.
Le culte des Nāga et la thérapeutique, in Journal Asiatique, 1938, p. 1-20.
"Document tibétain sur l'expansion du Dhyāna chinois", in Journal Asiatique, 1939, p. 505-523.
1939
Notes de mythologie bouddhique : 3. Les fils de Brahmā, dans Harvard Journal of Asiatic Studies, 4, 1939, p. 69-76 (with J. Przyluski).
"Sur la langue « nam »", in Journal Asiatique, 1939, p  453.
Inventaire des manuscrits tibétains de Touen-houang conservés à la Bibliothèque nationale (Fonds Pelliot-tibétain, nos 1-849), Paris, Adrien-Maisonneuve, 1939, in-4°, VII, XVI et 186 pages.
1940
Tun-huang Tibetan document on a Dharmadāna, dans Indian Historical Quarterly, XVI, 2, 1940, p. 292-298.
Les manuscrits tibétains de Touen-houang conservés à la Bibliothèque nationale de Paris, recueil des communications faites au Congrès international des Orientalistes, Bruxelles, 1938, p. 37, et AXXCIO, 1940, p. 292-298.
1941
Texte médical tibétain. Journal Asiatique (1941): 209-211.
1945
Obituary notice : Jean Przyluski, dans Indian Historical Quarterly, XXI, 2, June 1945, p. 157-162
1946
Mythologie indienne et peintures de Haute Asie : I. Le dieu bouddhique de la Fortune, dans Artibus Asiae, 1946, p. 97-111, 4 planches, 10 figures.
Un savant français : Jean Przyluski, dans Artibus Asiae, IX, 1946, p. 144-147.
1947
Documents de Touen-houang : I. Deux prières de caravaniers tibétains; II. Croix tournantes; III. Écriture tibétaine verticale, dans Mélanges chinois et bouddhiques, VIII, 1947, p. 317-326.
1949
Les chemins du mort dans les croyances de Haute Asie, dans Actes du XXIe Congrès international des Orientalistes, Paris,  Société asiatique,  1949, p. 210-212 (résumé) et Revue de l'Histoire des Religions, CXXXV, 1, 1949, p. 42-48.
Onze années de travaux européens sur le bouddhisme (mai 1936-mai 1947), dans Muséon, LXI, 3-4, p. 245-276.
Eleven years of works on Buddhism in Europe (1936–1947), dans Indian Historical Quarterly, XXV, 4, 1949.
1950
Préface à F. A. Bischoff, Contribution à l'étude des divinités mineures du bouddhisme tantrique : Āryamahābalanāma - Mahāyānasūtra, dans Buddhica, lre série, t. X, Paris, Geuthner, 1950, in-8°, p. IX-XII.
Le thème des dieux bisexués et celui des plantes herbacées dans les légendes de la Race solaire, dans Bulletin de l'École française d'Extrême-Orient, XLVI, 2, p. 577-580.
Manuel élémentaire de tibétain classique (méthode empirique), Paris Imprimerie nationale, Adrien-Maisonneuve, 1950, in-8°, v et 108 pages. 
Inventaire des manuscrits tibétains de Touen-houang conservés à la Bibliothèque nationale (Fonds Pelliot-tibétain, nos 850-1282), Paris, Bibliothèque nationale, 1950, in-4°, VII, xv et 97 pages.
1951
Études bouddhiques. Naissance, et traditions de la bouddhologie française, dans Cinquante ans d'orientalisme français, Bulletin de la Société des Études indochinoises 1951, p. 477-481, pi. XXI.
1952
Rituel Bon.po des funérailles royales (fonds Pelliot-tibétain n° 1042), dans Journal Asiatique, 1952, p. 339-361. — Réimprimé : Manuscrits de Haute Asie, I, Paris, Société asiatique, 1953, in-8°, 24 pages, 4 planches.
René Grousset (1885–1952), dans Journal Asiatique, 1952, p. 387-388.
1953
"Tibétain ancien Bod/Bon" Journal Asiatique 241 (1953), p. 275-276.
Contribution à la bibliographie du Kanjur et du Tanjur. Les textes bouddhiques au temps du roi Khri-sron-lde-bcan, dans Journal Asiatique, 1953, p. 313-354.
1954
Les manuscrits tibétains des grandes Prajnāpāramitā trouvés à Touen-houang, dans Silver Jubilee volume of the Zinbun Kagaku-Kenkyuso, I, Kyoto, 1954., 1954, p. 257-261.
1955
Revendications des fonctionnaires du grand Tibet au VIIIe siècle, dans Journal Asiatique, 1955, p. 171-212. — Réimprimé : Manuscrits de Haute Asie, III, Paris, Société asiatique, 1955, 42 pages, 2 planches.
A la recherche du Vidyādharapitaka : le cycle du Subāhupariprcchātan-tra, dans Studies in Indology and Buddhology... in honour of Pr. Susumu Yamaguchi, 1955, p. 70-72.
Littérature tibétaine, dans « Encyclopédie de la Pléiade » : Histoire des Littératures, I, Paris, Gallimard, 1955, p. 1119-1139.
Rétrospective : l'œuvre de Louis de La Vallée Poussin, dans Bibliographie bouddhique, XXIII bis, Paris, 1955, p. 1-37.
1956
Four notes on Vajrapāni, dans The Adyar Library Bulletin, XX, 3-4, 1956, p. 287-293.
1957
Hold or retain? dans East and West,  VII, Avril 1957, p. 328-329 (sur la signification de dhāranī).
Les religions du Tibet, Paris, Presses Universitaires de France, 1957, in-12, 101 pages («Mythes et Religions», n° 35).
Les plus anciens rouleaux tibétains trouvés à Touen-houang. Mémorial Stanislas Schayer, dans R. Or., XXI, 1957, p. 149-152.
1958
Fiefs, poisons et guérisseurs, dans Journal Asiatique, 1958, p. 157-201.
1959
Un aspect de l'avenir des études bouddhiques, dans Présence du Bouddhisme, dans France-Asie, Saigon, 1959, p. 679-680.
1961
A fifth note on Vajrapāni, dans The Adyar Library Bulletin, XXV, 1-4, 1961, p. 242-249.
Sūtra du bodhisattva « Roi de la Loi », dans Journal Asiatique, 1961, p. 321-332.
Inventaire des manuscrits tibétains de Touen-houang conservés à la Bibliothèque nationale, Paris, Bibliothèque nationale, 1961, in-4°, xii et 220 pages.
1962
Notes d'onomastique ‘A-za, dans Acta Orientalia Hugaricae,  1962. XV, 1-3, p. 207-209.
1964
Manuscrits tibétains de la Śatasāhasrikāprajñāpāramitā cachés à Touen-houang, dans Journal Asiatique, 1964, p. 479-486.
1965
Préliminaires d'une étude des ganacakra, in Studies of Esoteric Buddhism and Tantrism, Koyasan University, 1965, p. 41-46.
Chine et Tibet aux VIIe, VIIIe, IXe siècles, in Journal des savants, oct.-déc. 1965, p. 636-644.
Catalogue des principautés du Tibet ancien, in Journal Asiatique, 1965, p. 189-215.
1968
Jacques Bacot (1877–1965), in École pratique des Hautes Études. IVe section, Annuaire 1967-1968, Paris, 1968, p. 47-54, 1 photo.

Works in Honor of Marcelle Lalou
1971 Études tibétaines dédiées à la mémoire de Marcelle Lalou Paris: Adrien Maisonneuve.

Necrologies
Macdonald, A. Annuaire de l'Ecole Practique des Hautes Etudes, IVe Section (1968–1969): 51-60.
Filliozat, Jean. "L'oeuvre de Marcelle Lalou." Journal Asiatique (1969): 1-10.
Rona-Tas, Andras. Acta Orientalia Hungaricae (1968): 381-383.
Stein, Rolf. Marcelle Lalou (1890–1967). T'oung Pao (1969): 138-140.

References

Tibetologists
Academic staff of the University of Paris
1890 births
1967 deaths
University of Paris alumni